"What's a Guy Gotta Do" is a song co-written and recorded by American country music artist Joe Nichols.  It was released in November 2004 as the second and final single from his 2004 album Revelation.  The song peaked at number 4 on the US Billboard Hot Country Songs chart and number 64 on the Billboard Hot 100. Nichols wrote this song with Kelley Lovelace and Don Sampson.

Content
The song is an up-tempo in which the narrator asks himself, "what's a guy gotta do to get a girl in this town?"

Music video
The music video was directed by Peter Zavadil, and features a man who tries unsuccessfully to get a girlfriend, from being maced in the eyes to getting arrested for being accused of harassment at Wal-Mart. The video was shot on December 2, 2004 in Bowling Green, Kentucky.

Chart performance
"What's a Guy Gotta Do" debuted at number 55 on the U.S. Billboard Hot Country Singles & Tracks for the week of November 20, 2004.

Year-end charts

References

2004 singles
Joe Nichols songs
Show Dog-Universal Music singles
Music videos directed by Peter Zavadil
Song recordings produced by Brent Rowan
Songs written by Kelley Lovelace
Songs written by Don Sampson
2004 songs